Mount Blakiston is a mountain in the southwestern corner of Alberta, Canada and the highest point within Waterton Lakes National Park. The mountain is situated in the Clark Range, north of Lineham Creek and south of Blakiston Creek. Blakiston's closest neighbours include Mount Hawkins  directly to the west along a connecting ridge and Mount Lineham  to the south.

The mountain was named in 1858 for Thomas Blakiston, a member of the Palliser Expedition.

The Lineham Creek hiking trail passes along the foot of the southern slopes of the mountain and for capable scramblers, Blakiston's rubbly but steep southern slopes provide a suitable line of ascent. An ascent in 1942 by J. Gibson and G. Williams found an unmarked cairn on the summit so the first ascent party is unknown.

Geology

Like other mountains in Waterton Lakes National Park, Mount Blakiston is composed of sedimentary rock laid down during the Precambrian to Jurassic periods. Formed in shallow seas, this sedimentary rock was pushed east and over the top of younger Cretaceous period rock during the Laramide orogeny.

Climate
Based on the Köppen climate classification, Mount Blakiston is located in a subarctic climate with cold, snowy winters, and mild summers.

See also

Geology of Alberta

References

External links
 National Park Service web site: Waterton Lakes National Park
 Mt. Blakiston: Flickr photo

Blakiston
Blakiston
Canadian Rockies